The Meintangk are an indigenous Australian people, often classified as a subgroup of the Ngarrindjeri.

Country
Meintangk land extended across an estimated 1,500 sq. miles. To the south its coastal boundaries lay on Cape Jaffa and inland eastwards to Lucindale, Blackford, Keilira, and Naracoorte. The inland territory from Lake Hawdon to Mosquito Creek also formed part of their land.

People
The Meintangk comprised at least 7 hordes. Among these were the Paintjunga who were located at Penola.

Notable people
 Irene Watson, Professor of Law at University of South Australia Business School, is of mixed Meintangk and Tanganekald descent, and has written a book on the history of aboriginal peoples in the southeast.

Alternative names
 Painbali (This was the exonym used of the Meintangk by the Tanganekald).
 Paintjunga
 Pinchunga, Pinejunga
 Mootatunga
 Wepulprap (a Tanganekald term, signifying 'southern people').

Notes and references

Explanatory notes

Notes

References

Aboriginal peoples of South Australia